Igor Prieložný (born 25 February 1957) is a Slovak former volleyball player. He competed in the men's tournament at the 1980 Summer Olympics.

References

1957 births
Living people
Sportspeople from Trnava
Slovak men's volleyball players
Olympic volleyball players of Czechoslovakia
Volleyball players at the 1980 Summer Olympics
Jastrzębski Węgiel coaches